Raymond Cattin (born 23 July 1952) is a Swiss sailor. He competed in the Tornado event at the 1988 Summer Olympics.

References

External links
 

1952 births
Living people
Swiss male sailors (sport)
Olympic sailors of Switzerland
Sailors at the 1988 Summer Olympics – Tornado
Place of birth missing (living people)